Jerônima Mesquita (30 April 1880 – 1972) was a Brazilian feminist. She is regarded as the pioneer of the women's movement in Brazil, and co-founded the Federação Brasileira pelo Progresso Feminino with Berta Lutz and Stela Guerra Duval in 1922.

References

1880 births
1972 deaths
Brazilian suffragists
Brazilian feminists